Naran Togoruu ( Sun Cranes) is a novel by Mongolian author Sengiin Erdene. It was first published in 1972 by Ulsyn Khevleliin Gazar.

References

Novels by Sengiin Erdene
1972 novels